"All Dressed in Love" is a song written by Gnarls Barkley's Cee-Lo, Jack Splash (from the group Plantlife) and Salaam Remi and recorded by Jennifer Hudson for Sex and the City: The Movie. Despite not being released as a single, the song debuted at number 72 on the UK Singles Chart on the strength of paid downloads alone.

The songs appears in the film's closing moments as the characters celebrate Samantha's 50th birthday.

Charts

Weekly charts

Year-end charts

References

2008 songs
Jennifer Hudson songs
Songs written by Salaam Remi
Song recordings produced by Salaam Remi
Songs written by CeeLo Green